Puerto Rico first participated at the Olympic Games in 1948, and has sent athletes to compete in every Summer Olympic Games since then. Puerto Rico has also participated in the Winter Olympic Games since 1984, but did not participate in the Games of 2006, 2010, and 2014.

Puerto Rican athletes have won a total of ten medals. Six medals were won in boxing, two in track and field, one in tennis, and one in wrestling.

The Puerto Rican national baseball team won a bronze medal at the 1988 Summer Olympic Games in Seoul, South Korea. However, that medal is not counted among Puerto Rico's Olympic medals totals as baseball was an exhibition sport during those games.

The Puerto Rico Olympic Committee was created in 1948 and recognized by the International Olympic Committee that same year. "La Borinqueña" (not the U.S. national anthem) is played when Puerto Rican competitors win Olympic medals.

Medal tables

Medals by Summer Games

Medals by Winter Games

Medals by Summer Youth Games

Medals by summer sport

List of medalists

See also 

 List of flag bearers for Puerto Rico at the Olympics
 Puerto Rico Olympic Committee
 :Category:Olympic competitors for Puerto Rico
 Tropical nations at the Winter Olympics
 Puerto Rico at the Paralympics

References

External links 
 
 
 
  Olympic Participation a Source of Pride in Puerto Rico.  Sean Jensen. SportsEngine Inc. 3 October 2018. Accessed 1 February 2022. Archived.